Killer Meteors, (Chinese: 風雨雙流星) (or The Killer Meteors, Jackie Chan vs. Wang Yu) is a 1976 kung fu Hong Kong action film, directed by Jimmy Wang Yu and Lo Wei. Since then, it have become a cult film.

Overview
Jackie Chan plays Immortal Meteor, who terrorizes a small town in Hong Kong. Killer Weapon (Jimmy Wang Yu) sets out to stop him.

Cast
 Jimmy Wang Yu as Killer Weapon
 Jackie Chan as Immortal Meteor

See also
 Jackie Chan filmography
 List of Hong Kong films
 List of martial arts films

References

External links

1976 films
1976 action films
1976 martial arts films
Hong Kong action films
Hong Kong martial arts films
1970s Cantonese-language films
1970s Hong Kong films